Eric Brunner (born February 12, 1986) is a retired American soccer player who played as a defender.

Career

Professional

Following his college career Brunner was selected 16th in the 2008 MLS SuperDraft by New York Red Bulls. He initially signed a senior contract, but when the Red Bulls signed Andrew Boyens, they tried to move him down to the developmental roster. However, Brunner refused to take the pay cut and left the team. He signed with Miami FC of the USL First Division of May 20, 2008. Brunner made his first appearance for Miami on June 14, 2008, when he came on as a substitute and played for five minutes.

He made his Columbus debut against Colorado Rapids on April 11, 2009, and scored his first career professional goal on June 20, 2009, against FC Dallas.

On November 24, 2010, he was selected by the Portland Timbers in the 2011 MLS Expansion Draft. He was a frequent starter for the Timbers until suffering a concussion on May 26, 2012, after which he sat out much of the remainder of the 2012 season.

On December 3, 2012, he was traded to the Houston Dynamo in exchange for allocation money.

He retired following the 2014 season.

International
Brunner was called up to play for the United States under-23 men's national soccer team at the 2008 Toulon Tournament.

Personal life
Brunner is a gamer, and streams live gameplay under the pseudonym "Broomsweeper" on Twitch. As of 24 December 2014, he has over 8,400 followers and primarily plays Counter-Strike: Global Offensive on his channel.

References

External links

Ohio State bio

1986 births
Living people
American soccer players
Maryland Terrapins men's soccer players
Ohio State Buckeyes men's soccer players
Flint City Bucks players
New York Red Bulls players
Miami FC (2006) players
Columbus Crew players
Portland Timbers players
Houston Dynamo FC players
People from Dublin, Ohio
Soccer players from Ohio
USL League Two players
USL First Division players
Major League Soccer players
United States men's under-23 international soccer players
New York Red Bulls draft picks
All-American men's college soccer players
Association football defenders